Theo Nathaniel Epstein (born December 29, 1973) is an American Major League Baseball executive, who currently works for MLB as a consultant. He was the vice president and general manager for the Boston Red Sox and then the president of baseball operations for the Chicago Cubs. He worked for each team for nine seasons.

While working for both teams, Epstein became notable for helping to end two of the longest World Series droughts in the history of Major League Baseball. In 2004, the Red Sox won their first World Series championship in 86 years; in 2016, the Cubs won their first World Series championship in 108 years.

Early life 
Epstein was born to a secular Jewish family in New York City and raised in Brookline, Massachusetts. He attended Brookline High School (a 1991 graduate), and played baseball for the Brookline High School Warriors, but dreamed of working for the Red Sox.

Epstein attended Yale University, where he lived at Jonathan Edwards College. He served as sports editor of the Yale Daily News. He graduated in 1995 with a degree in American Studies. During his time as an undergraduate, he wrote letters to several teams expressing interest in working for them. His letter to the Baltimore Orioles reached team executive Calvin Hill, a Yale alumnus and head of personnel, who invited him for an interview. Epstein interned for three consecutive summers for the Orioles. Eventually he was hired as the public relations assistant for the Orioles.

Career

San Diego Padres
Epstein then moved with Larry Lucchino to the San Diego Padres as director of player development. While working for the Padres, he also studied at the University of San Diego School of Law and earned a Juris Doctor degree at Lucchino's suggestion. Epstein based his class selection on which professors seemed to be the most lenient with attendance policies given the Padres' often-late work hours. By studying law Epstein was invited to take part in high-level negotiations and discussions by then-GM Kevin Towers since few in the Padres' small operations division had a legal background to understand contract language. Epstein worked his way up to become the team's Director of Baseball Operations.

Boston Red Sox

After leaving the position as the Padres' President, Lucchino became president and chief executive officer (CEO) of the Red Sox on November 15, 2001 and hired Epstein to work under him. At the end of the 2002 season, Lucchino appointed Epstein to replace interim general manager (GM) Mike Port. Epstein is credited with initiating the trade of Nomar Garciaparra and making key contract acquisitions including those of Bill Mueller and Curt Schilling during his first tenure as Red Sox GM. The new players were regarded as instrumental in breaking the so-called "Curse of the Bambino" when the Red Sox defeated the St. Louis Cardinals in the 2004 World Series, their first championship since 1918.

On October 31, 2005, Epstein resigned, rejecting a three-year, $1.5-million-per-year contract for personal reasons. According to The Boston Globe, "This is a job you have to give your whole heart and soul to", he said. "In the end, after a long period of reflection about myself and the program, I decided I could no longer put my whole heart and soul into it." Because it was Halloween the night he resigned from the Red Sox, Epstein left Fenway Park wearing a gorilla suit in an attempt to avoid reporters. A witness reported spotting a person wearing a gorilla suit driving a Volvo similar to Epstein's that night. The suit was loaned to him and was later auctioned for $11,000. The money raised was given to The Jimmy Fund and the Foundation to be Named Later (FTBNL).

Epstein remained in contact with the team's front office and in January 2006, he and Red Sox management announced he would return, resuming the title of general manager and add the title of executive vice president. The Red Sox went on to win the 2007 World Series, Epstein's second championship with Boston. In November 2007, Epstein announced, at the annual general manager meeting, that he had signed a new contract with the Red Sox but declined to disclose the terms of the deal.

Chicago Cubs

On October 12, 2011, Epstein agreed to a five-year contract worth $18.5 million with the Chicago Cubs. On October 19, 2011, it was reported that Epstein's official title with the Cubs would be president and that San Diego Padres general manager Jed Hoyer would take the GM position with the Cubs.

On October 23, 2011, he took out a full-page ad in The Boston Globe, thanking Red Sox fans and the team's owners for their support. Two days later, the Cubs officially introduced Epstein as
president of baseball operations. The Cubs finished in last place in the National League Central for the first three years of Epstein's presidency, as the focus was to acquire young talent rather than maximize short-term competitiveness. After a three-year rebuild, the Cubs clinched a playoff berth in 2015 and advanced to the National League Championship Series, where they were swept by the New York Mets.

Epstein signed an extension with the club on September 28, 2016, with a contract estimated to be worth up to $25 million. The Cubs would proceed to break the so-called "Curse of the Billy Goat" by defeating Cleveland Indians in the 2016 World Series, their first championship since 1908.

Epstein stepped down from his role on the Cubs on November 20, 2020. Jed Hoyer, Epstein's long-time deputy, took over his position.

MLB consultant and private equity
In January 2021, MLB hired Epstein as a consultant for "on-field matters". Later that year, he joined private equity firm Arctos Sports Partners.

Personal life
Epstein has a twin brother, Paul, who is a social worker at Brookline High School in Brookline, Massachusetts. He and Paul are co-founders of "The Foundation to be Named Later", established in 2005.

Epstein's grandfather, Philip G. Epstein, and great-uncle, Julius J. Epstein – with Howard E. Koch – won Academy Awards for the screenplay of Casablanca, while his father, novelist Leslie Epstein, heads the Creative Writing Program at Boston University. His mother, Ilene (Gradman), opened a clothing store. Epstein's sister, Anya, is a screenwriter and television producer (Homicide: Life on the Street and Tell Me You Love Me).

On January 12, 2007, Epstein married Marie Whitney, a Roman Catholic, who is the founder and creative director of Two Penny Blue. The couple have two sons, Jack and Andrew. An initial report on the marriage from Boston Globe sportswriter Gordon Edes said the site of the wedding was Nathan's Famous hot dog stand at Coney Island. Edes later published a correction, noting that he had fallen for a prank by Theo's father, Leslie. The site and actual date of the wedding was never released, but the Boston Herald later published a story claiming the wedding took place on Red Sox owner John Henry's yacht in Saint Thomas.

Charity
Epstein's "Hot Stove Cool Music" are biannual Boston and Chicago benefit concerts that have raised millions of dollars for the "disadvantaged youth and families" of the respective cities. Epstein said in advance of the 2015 event, "We've collectively raised more than $6 million and look forward to increasing that total this year through another great night of music, baseball and giving back."

Honors and awards
As a front office executive, Epstein is a three-time World Series Champion, winning twice with the Red Sox (2004 and 2007) and once with the Cubs (2016).

In 2007, the United States Sports Academy named Epstein the recipient of its "Carl Maddox Sport Management Award."

In December 2008, Baseball America named Epstein its Baseball America Major League Executive of the Year.

In March 2009, the book Theo-logy: How a Boy Wonder Led the Red Sox to the Promised Land is published.

In September 2009, Epstein was named Sporting News Executive of the Decade. At the same time, the Red Sox were named Sporting News Team of the Decade. In December, Sports Illustrated named him MLB's Best General Manager of the Decade and number 3 on its list of the Top 10 GMs/Executives of the Decade (in all sports).

In November 2016, Epstein was named the Sporting News Executive of the Year. Also in November, Epstein won the Esurance MLB Award for Best Executive.

In March 2017, Epstein was announced as Yale's Class Day Speaker. Fortune Magazine also ranked Epstein #1 in their 2017 list of the "World's Greatest Leaders". In April 2017, Time Magazine named Epstein one of the world's 100 most influential people.

References

Further reading

External links

Theo Epstein News Video Clips
Theo's Statement of Resignation
Sox Make An Executive Revision, article discussing Epstein's rehiring, from The Boston Globe, January 25, 2006.

1973 births
Living people
Sportspeople from New York City
Sportspeople from Brookline, Massachusetts
Jewish American baseball people
American twins
Yale College alumni
University of San Diego School of Law alumni
Major League Baseball general managers
Boston Red Sox executives
Chicago Cubs executives
San Diego Padres executives
Twin sportspeople
Brookline High School alumni
Baseball people from Massachusetts
21st-century American Jews